East Grange railway station served the area of East Grange, Fife, Scotland, from 1850 to 1958 on the Stirling and Dunfermline Railway.

History 
The station opened as Eastgrange, Culross and Torryburn on 28 August 1850 by the North British Railway. To the west was the goods yard and to the north was the signal box, which was reduced to a ground frame in 1926. The station's name was changed to East Grange, Culross and Torryburn in 1878, changed to East Grange and Culross in 1886 and changed to East Grange in 1909. The station closed to passengers on 15 September 1958.

References 

Disused railway stations in Fife
Railway stations in Great Britain opened in 1850
Railway stations in Great Britain closed in 1958
Former North British Railway stations
1850 establishments in Scotland
1958 disestablishments in Scotland
Blairhall